Reclaim Australia: Reduce Immigration (RARI) was a minor Australian political party that was active from 1996 to 1999. 
The party advocated reducing Immigration to Australia and was associated with the far right of Australian politics. The party was deregistered due to a lack of members, and was largely displaced by the more successful One Nation and, to a lesser extent, Australians Against Further Immigration (AAFI). The party's best electoral result was in the by-election following the retirement of former Prime Minister Paul Keating from the federal seat of Blaxland. In this by-election, the Liberal Party did not field a candidate to oppose the sitting Labor Party, and, although RARI finished behind AAFI on the primary vote, on preferences RARI was able to come second in the seat.

Federal parliament

References

Political parties established in 1996
Political parties disestablished in 1999
1996 establishments in Australia
1999 disestablishments in Australia
Single-issue political parties
Defunct far right political parties in Australia
Anti-immigration politics in Australia